"Movement" is a 2011 science fiction short story by Nancy Fulda. It was first published in Asimov's Science Fiction.

Synopsis

Hannah is a teenage girl with "temporal autism", who is offered a potential cure.

Reception

"Movement" was a finalist for the 2011 Nebula Award for Best Short Story and the 2012 Hugo Award for Best Short Story.

References

External links
Text of the story at NancyFulda.com

2011 short stories
Science fiction short stories
Works originally published in Asimov's Science Fiction